The 2018 Turkish Super Cup (Turkish: TFF Süper Kupa) was the 45th edition of the Turkish Super Cup since its establishment as Presidential Cup in 1966, the annual Turkish football season-opening match contested by the winners of the previous season's top league and cup competitions (or cup runner-up in case the league- and cup-winning club is the same). It was played on 5 August 2018 between the champions of the 2017–18 Süper Lig, Galatasaray, and the winners of the 2017–18 Turkish Cup, Akhisarspor.

Match

Details

References

 

2018
Super Cup
Sport in Konya
Turkish Super Cup
Turkish Super Cup 2018
Galatasaray S.K. (football) matches
Akhisarspor matches